Radio 7 is a German radio station. It is broadcast in southeastern Baden-Württemberg and can also be received in neighboring Switzerland. Its main studio is located in Ulm, it also has local studios in Aalen, Ravensburg and Tuttlingen. Radio 7 has about 164,000 listeners per hour in Germany and 73,000 listeners per hour in Switzerland.

Frequencies
FM Aalen: 103.7
FM Ulm: 101.8
FM Ulm Donautal: 90.0
FM Iberger Kugel: 105.0
FM Ravensburg: 96.9
FM Witthoh: 102.5
FM Villingen-Schwenningen: 101.2

References

External links
Official website

Radio stations in Germany
Baden-Württemberg